Ludwig Schneider (born 19 September 1968) is a German wrestler. He competed in the men's freestyle 90 kg at the 1992 Summer Olympics.

References

1968 births
Living people
German male sport wrestlers
Olympic wrestlers of Germany
Wrestlers at the 1992 Summer Olympics
People from Harghita County